Adolfo J. Rumbos is an American mathematician whose research interests include nonlinear analysis and boundary value problems. He is the Joseph N. Fiske Professor of Mathematics at Pomona College in Claremont, California.

References

External links
Faculty page at Pomona College

Year of birth missing (living people)
Living people
Pomona College faculty
American mathematicians